B7 Baltic Islands Network is a transnational cooperation between the local administrations or governments of seven islands in the Baltic Sea.

Scope
The network is made up of the local administrations or governments of the islands of Bornholm (Denmark), Gotland (Sweden), Hiiumaa (Estonia), Rügen (Germany), Saaremaa (Estonia), Åland (autonomous part of Finland) and Öland (Sweden).

The network has two decision-making bodies; a "steering committee", which is the politically responsible body, and a managing authority, called the "board". The cooperation is funded by member fees, which are according to population size.

Purpose
The network aims at promoting the various interests of the islands at national and international level, as well as to function as a platform for exchange of ideas and experiences.

References

External links
 Official website

Baltic Sea